Waiting for the Day is the debut studio album by Australian band Bachelor Girl. The album was released in Australia through Gotham Records on 9 November 1998 (see 1998 in music). The album charted in the top twenty on the Australian ARIA Albums Chart and was certified platinum.

The album yielded four singles; "Buses and Trains", "Treat Me Good", "Lucky Me" and "Blown Away" as well as one promotional single "Permission to Shine".

At the ARIA Music Awards of 1999, the album won the ARIA Award for Producer of the Year as well as being nominated for Breakthrough Artist – Album and Best Pop Release.

It was released in the United States of America in 1999, under the title Breaking Through from Down Under with a slightly altered track listing.

Reception
Heather Phares from AllMusic said "Bachelor Girl provide plenty of youthful, shiny dance-pop on their debut album. Songs like "Blown Away", "Buses and Trains" and "Treat Me Good" showcase Tania Doko's girlish yet powerful voice and James Roche's songwriting and production skills." calling it "A catchy, entertaining album"

Track listing
 Australian Version
 "Buses and Trains" (James Roche) – 3:42
 "Gotta Let You Go" (Tania Doko, Roche) – 5:41
 "Treat Me Good" (Doko, Jimmy McDonnell, Roche) – 4:31
 "This Must Be Love (Like It or Not)" (Doko, Roche) – 4:07
 "Waiting for the Day" (Roche) – 4:07
 "My World" (Doko, Randy Goodrum, Roche, N. Sloan) – 4:20
 "You Are Afraid" (Roche) – 4:58
 "Someway, Somehow" (Doko, Roche) – 5:14
 "Blind" (Doko, Roche) – 4:11
 "Don't Hold Back" (Michael O'Rourke, Roche) – 4:57
 "I Don't Believe You" (Doko, Roche) – 3:59
 "Mad About You" (Doko, Roche) – 5:06

Japan edition
"Treat Me Good" (Cyber mix) – 5:40

Australian re-issued edition
"Lucky Me" (Roche) – 4:31
"Permission to Shine" (Bridget Benenate) – 4:18
"Blown Away" (S. Cutler, A. Preven) – 4:36
"You Are Afraid" (remix)
"Blind" (remix)

 US Version – Breaking Through from Down Under (1999)
 Buses And Trains – 3:41
 Blown Away – 4:36
 Lucky Me – 4:30
 Permission To Shine – 4:16
 Treat Me Good	 – 4:29
 Gotta Let You Go – 5:25
 Waiting for the Day – 5:06
 This Must Be Love (Like It Or Not) – 4:05
 You Are Afraid – 4:56
 I Don't Believe You – 3:58
 Someway, Somehow – 4:20
 Mad About You	 – 5:04

Charts
Waiting for the Day was commercially successful in Australia, spending nine months in the top fifty and peaking in the top twenty on the Australian ARIA Albums Chart.

Year-end charts

Certifications

Release history

References

1998 debut albums
Bachelor Girl albums
ARIA Award-winning albums
Gotham Records albums